Testosterone phenylbutyrate, also known as testosterone phenylbutanoate, testosterone 17β-phenylbutyrate, and androst-4-en-17β-ol-3-one 17β-phenylbutyrate, is a synthetic, injected anabolic-androgenic steroid (AAS) and an androgen ester – specifically, the C17β phenylbutyrate (phenylbutanoate) ester of testosterone – which was never marketed. It is a prodrug of testosterone and, when administered via intramuscular injection, is associated with a long-lasting depot effect and extended duration of action.

See also
 Testosterone cyclohexylpropionate
 Testosterone cypionate
 Testosterone phenylacetate
 Testosterone phenylpropionate

References

Androgens and anabolic steroids
Androstanes
Ketones
Prodrugs
Testosterone esters
Abandoned drugs